Mega Man X6, known as  in Japan, is a video game developed and published by Capcom. It is the sixth main entry in the Mega Man X series. The game was first released on the PlayStation in Japan on November 29, 2001 and was later made available in both North America and Europe.

The plot of Mega Man X6 takes place during the 22nd century where humans and intelligent Robots called "Reploids" live together. The game follows shortly after the events of Mega Man X5 in which planet Earth was devastated by an attack by the "Maverick" leader Sigma and the protagonist Zero sacrificed his own life to save it. As the world recovers, a Maverick known only as the "Zero Nightmare" has begun spreading chaos. Zero's comrade X, curious of its name, seeks out this new threat. Like past games in the series, Mega Man X6 is an action-platformer in which the player tackles a series of stages and adds the unique weapon of each boss to X's arsenal.

Prominent series artist and producer Keiji Inafune was not involved in the game's production, as he had intended the fifth installment in the series to be the last with Zero's death. Critically, Mega Man X6 has received mixed to positive reviews. The game was released for the Microsoft Windows in different parts of Asia in 2002 and 2003. It was also re-released in 2006 as part of the North American Mega Man X Collection for the GameCube and PlayStation 2. Mega Man X6 was made available on the PlayStation Network as part of the PSOne Classics line on July 8, 2015 in Japan. It was released for Windows internationally, along with PlayStation 4, Xbox One and Nintendo Switch as a part of Mega Man X Legacy Collection 2 (Rockman X Anniversary Collection 2 in Japan) on July 24, 2018 and July 26, 2018 for Japan.

Plot

Three weeks have passed since the events of Mega Man X5. Zero is missing, presumed dead. As a result of the Eurasia space colony incident, Earth's surface has been rendered uninhabitable, forcing the human population to take refuge underground. An intelligent Reploid researcher, Gate, is searching through the ruins of Eurasia and finds something unusual. A week later, Gate goes mad as he completes an experiment, and declares his intentions to turn Earth into a utopia for high-class Reploids.

Meanwhile, X is awakened by Alia after a dream involving Zero, and she informs him of a large Maverick near Eurasia. He briefly encounters a being reminiscent to Zero, although the being appears distorted and discolored. X then meets a scientist named Isoc and his subordinate, High Max, who are in the search of the Zero-like being, which they identify as the "Zero Nightmare". Isoc invites all Reploids to join his cause to destroy the Nightmare phenomena, which is turning the Reploid population into Mavericks. However, this is revealed to be a ruse to lure Reploids to areas affected by the Nightmare, where they will become Mavericks under Gate's control.

X journeys to the suspected areas to investigate the Nightmare phenomena and rescue the Reploids who volunteered to help. He learns that Isoc's eight investigators have been infected by the Nightmare and become Mavericks. During his battles, X can also encounter the Zero Nightmare and defeat him. Following this, the real Zero appears, unaware of how he survived his battle against Sigma. Nonetheless, he reunites with X, and rejoins the Maverick Hunters to continue investigating the Nightmare.

Following the defeat of the eight investigators (or High Max), X and Zero meet Gate, who reveals he found a piece of Zero's DNA at the Eurasia crash site. The DNA drove Gate insane, and he created the Nightmare phenomena alongside the Zero Nightmare to help build his utopia.

The Hunters go to Gate's laboratory to put to a stop to his plans. Following Gate's defeat, he confesses he has rebuilt Sigma, and was using him as a trump card, but Sigma is a shell of his former self: a partially coherent, half-built body, with his programming still severely damaged. However, Sigma has enough strength to nearly kill Gate, and challenges X and Zero. With his sanity slipping, Sigma is once again defeated and one of three endings will occur, depending on which character defeats Sigma:
If X defeats Sigma and previously defeated the Zero Nightmare, Zero is alongside X as he rescues Gate so that Alia, his former colleague, can try and revive him if she chooses to do so. The three make a pact to repair the devastated Earth, while Gate's ultimate fate is never revealed.
If X defeats Sigma, but did not defeat the Zero Nightmare, Alia is instead with X at the end, who thanks him for rescuing Gate. X leaves Gate's fate up to Alia, which is left unknown. Zero is then shown to be alive, but refrains from revealing himself to X and Alia, despite the two being able to sense his presence. Zero says he'll be leaving the fighting to X for a while, as there's something he needs to do.
If Zero defeats Sigma, he is seen at a laboratory at an undetermined period in the future. Fearing that he still possesses the Sigma Virus and could become a Maverick, he requests to be placed in stasis. An unknown scientist agrees to help him, and seals Zero away for the next 102 years, presumably leading to the events of the Mega Man Zero series.

Gameplay

The gameplay is very similar to Mega Man X5.  The player can select X with the option to outfit him with different armors offering unique abilities (most of which have to be downloaded, as always, through Dr. Light's hidden capsules.) Zero can be unlocked after finding and defeating the Zero Nightmare, bringing his own weapons and techniques to the fold, including a refined Z-Saber fighting style. Both characters can be equipped with various power-up items earned after rescuing certain Reploids.

Mega Man X6 has an increased emphasis on rescuing Reploids over previous titles in the series. Whereas previous games rewarded the player with health or an extra life, Mega Man X6 rewards the player with additional parts or other permanent prizes. Rescuing Reploids was made more difficult in this game with the addition of the Nightmare, which makes any Reploid it infects evil, thus rendering the Reploid impossible to save. The parts system was altered as well. Rather than attach a certain part to a certain armor, parts are attached to the character itself. The number of parts that can be equipped at once is dependent on the player's rank, which is increased by harvesting Nightmare Souls.

Depending on the player's actions during the game, it's possible to unlock what are normally the final set of stages, namely Gate's laboratory, much earlier than normal than what is considered the norm for the X series; with the exception of Mega Man X5, players normally had to defeat the 8 main bosses before unlocking the final stages. In X6, defeating both the Zero Nightmare and High Max, Isoc's bodyguard, are enough to unlock Gate's laboratory before even defeating most of the main bosses.

Development
Series producer Keiji Inafune was not involved in the development of Mega Man X6. He had originally intended for the fifth chapter in the series to be the last due to the death of Zero at that game's conclusion. "And so I’d always planned to make Zero come back to life in the Mega Man Zero series, but then X6 comes out sooner from another division and Zero comes back to life in that, and I’m like, 'What's this!? Now my story for Zero doesn’t make sense! Zero's been brought back to life two times!'" Inafune also felt he owed fans of the series an apology for the decision to create Mega Man X6, although the series was "starting to go in a direction out of [his] control" at that point. Artist Haruki Suetsugu, who had worked on both previous PlayStation Mega Man X games, signed on as the game's primary character designer and promotional artwork illustrator. Suetsugu stated that the development schedule of Mega Man X6 was tight. As such, he described his designs for the Maverick bosses were "relatively simple", and he took a similar approach to designing all of them: for instance, all of the Mavericks have the characteristic head fins and forehead jewel found on their creator Gate's helmet. The designs for other characters also feature unique traits, including Gate as a "merging of scientists and combatants, High Max as "big and strong", and the DNA-like Nightmare.

The background music for Mega Man X6 was composed by Naoto Tanaka. The game also features the opening vocal songs "Moon Light" and "The Answer" by Showtaro Morikubo (the voice actor for X) and the ending theme "I.D.E.A" by RoST.  This is one of the few X games to have the opening song appear in both the Japanese and English versions. All of the game's instrumental and vocal music was compiled on the Capcom Music Generation: Rockman X1 ~ X6 soundtrack released by Suleputer in 2003.
The game was not dubbed in any language other than the original Japanese, and the North American and European versions retained the Japanese voice tracks, using translated English subtitles to tell the story. The voice tracks for the cutscenes were removed completely when Mega Man X6 was re-released as a part of Mega Man X Collection for the PlayStation 2 and Nintendo GameCube in North America in 2006, though the in-game voice tracks are still retained.

Reception

According to the Japanese magazine Famitsu, Mega Man X6 was the seventh best-selling game in Japan during its week of release at 39,318 units sold. Dengeki Online reported that Mega Man X6 sold a total of 106,980 units in Japan by the end of 2001, marking it as the 109th best-selling game of the year in the region. The game eventually saw a re-release as part of the PlayStation the Best range of budget titles. Mega Man X6 was also included on the North American Mega Man X Collection for the Nintendo GameCube and PlayStation 2 in 2006.

Mega Man X6 received mixed reviews, with an average score of 69% on GameRankings. GameSpot gave the game a 7 out of 10, saying that the game is "a disappointing effort. The nightmare system and item collecting add variety and longevity to the game, but... The graphics aren't really even up to the standards set by older games in the series, and while the music is good, there aren't any tracks that particularly stand out. Despite these shortcomings, it's still Mega Man, and the gameplay is still entertaining, making X6 an attractive package for hard-core Mega Man fans." IGN gave a more positive review, an 8 out 10, stating "It's an all-new Mega Man game, yet it's still pretty much the same. There's nothing wrong with that"; they praised the soundtrack and replay value. Among the most negative reviews, Electronic Gaming Monthly gave the game a 3.5 out of 10, saying "I thought I’d sooner see Sasquatch ride a Chimera bareback through the streets than a bland series like Mega Man X last through six installments."

In retrospective, 1UP.com referred to Mega Man X6 as "sloppy" citing multiple issues within its design such as repetitive stages and background images.

References

External links
Official website 

 

2001 video games
Mega Man X games
PlayStation (console) games
PlayStation Network games
Windows games
Malware in fiction
Video games developed in Japan
Video game sequels
Video games about viral outbreaks
Video games set in Australia
Video games set in China
Video games set in Ecuador
Video games set in Indonesia
Video games set in North America
Video games set in North Korea
Video games set in the Northern Mariana Islands
Post-apocalyptic video games
Superhero video games